Damias szetschwana is a moth of the family Erebidae. It is found in the province of Sichuan, China.

References

Damias
Moths described in 1926